Dawn Jackson Blatner is an American registered dietitian, television and media personality, and published author of the books The Flexitarian Diet and The Superfood Swap.

She has been hailed as Chicago's "top dietitian" and "one of the best nutritionists in the country." She is the host of the lifestyle program SEE Chicago (Shopping, Entertainment, and Events) on WGN-TV.

Work as a Dietitian

Blatner obtained her Bachelor of Science in 1997 for Food Science, Human Nutrition and Dietetics from the University of Illinois. In 2002, she joined the Northwestern Memorial Hospital's Wellness Institute and became a spokeswoman for the American Dietetic Association.

Blatner is a Registered Dietitian Nutritionist (RDN) and Certified Specialist in Sports Dietetics (CSSD). She is the Nutrition Consultant for the Chicago Cubs, former food and nutrition blogger with the Huffington Post, a nutrition expert on the advisory board of SHAPE Magazine, and a launch member of the People Magazine "Health Squad". She is the author of two award-winning books: The Flexitarian Diet and The Superfood Swap. She recently starred in (and subsequently won) the hit primetime ABC television show called, My Diet Is Better Than Yours.. Blatner received Lifetime Television's “Remarkable Woman Award” for her work in the field of nutrition and has over 15 years experience working with clients to super-charge their health. She is the creator of the Nutrition WOW blog & weekly eblast, which was ranked the best RD blog by Health Magazine.

Blatner maintains a weekly blog called the Nutrition WOW which was named the "Best RD Blog" by Health Magazine.

The Flexitarian Diet

Blatner is best known for her advocacy of the flexitarian diet, a semi-vegetarian diet with emphasis on fruits, vegetables, legumes and whole grains with a moderated intake of animal products. In 2009, she authored Flexitarian Diet: The Mostly Vegetarian Way to Lose Weight, Be Healthier, Prevent Disease, and Add Years to Your Life. According to the U.S. News & World Report Best Diet Rankings the flexitarian diet ranked number 2 in Best Diets Overall.

Selected publications

The Flexitarian Diet (McGraw-Hill, 2009) 
The Superfood Swap (Houghton Mifflin Harcourt, 2016)

References

External links
 Official website

Year of birth missing (living people)
Living people
University of Illinois Urbana-Champaign alumni
American food writers
American health and wellness writers
American television personalities
American women nutritionists
American nutritionists
American women television personalities
Dietitians
Plant-based diet advocates